Kur Gaz-e Bala (also Romanized as Kūr Gaz-e Bālā; also known as Khuryās and Kūreh Gaz Bālā) is a village in Alqurat Rural District, in the Central District of Birjand County, South Khorasan Province, Iran. At the 2006 census, its population was 17, in 5 families.

References 

Populated places in Birjand County